The 2013 FIBA EuroChallenge Final Four was the concluding tournament of the 2012–13 FIBA EuroChallenge season. The Final Four was held in the Karşıyaka Arena at Izmir, Turkey.

Bracket

Semifinals

Third place game

Final

References

Final four
FIBA EuroChallenge Final Fours
2012–13 in Turkish basketball
2012–13 in French basketball
2012–13 in Russian basketball
2012–13 in German basketball
International basketball competitions hosted by Turkey